Peter Gabriel is the debut studio album by the English singer-songwriter and producer Peter Gabriel, released on 25 February 1977 by Charisma Records. After his departure from the progressive rock band Genesis was made public in 1975, Gabriel took a break to concentrate on his family life. In 1976, he began writing material for a solo album and met producer Bob Ezrin, who agreed to produce it. Gabriel hired several additional musicians to play on the album, including guitarist Robert Fripp and bassist Tony Levin. The album was later known as Peter Gabriel I or Car, referring to the album's artwork produced by Hipgnosis. Some music streaming services refer to it as Peter Gabriel 1: Car.

Upon the album's release, it peaked at No. 7 on the UK Albums Chart and No. 38 on the US Billboard 200. It has since reached Gold certification in both countries for selling 100,000 and 500,000 copies, respectively. The song "Solsbury Hill" was the first single from the album, and peaked at No. 13 in the UK. Gabriel supported the album with a tour of Europe and the US through 1977, featuring a seven-piece band including Fripp and Levin. The album was remastered in 2002 and 2011.

Background and recording 
In August 1975, Gabriel's departure from the progressive rock band Genesis was made public. He had announced the decision to the band early into their tour supporting The Lamb Lies Down on Broadway (1974), citing estrangement from the other members, the strains on his marriage, and his wish to spend more time with his family. He also wanted to avoid giving the impression of quitting Genesis "to run off and do my solo album", and took a break. Genesis drummer Phil Collins, who later replaced Gabriel as lead vocalist, said the band had known about Gabriel's departure for some time. When they learned that Gabriel was to make a solo album, they sent a telegram wishing him luck.

By mid-1976, Gabriel had recorded a collection of demos for his album. He considered several producers, including Todd Rundgren and Jack Nitzsche. Someone suggested Canadian producer Bob Ezrin, known for working with Alice Cooper, Lou Reed and Kiss. Gabriel played his demo of "Here Comes the Flood" to Ezrin, who enjoyed the track so much he went to bed that night singing the song. He said: "We understood each other. We talked. There was an excellent rapport immediately – a human rapport – and that was what I was looking for above all." The pair agreed to share production duties; Ezrin led the "American rhythm sections" and "very rock passages", while Gabriel led the "more European things" and "quiet parts".

Peter Gabriel was recorded at The Soundstage in Toronto in the autumn of 1976, with additional sessions at Morgan and Olympic Studios in London. Gabriel was uncertain of what parts he could and could not perform, so he agreed to Ezrin's choice of musicians, including bassist Tony Levin and guitarist Robert Fripp to cover Gabriel's soundscape-oriented ideas. Gabriel recalled the Toronto sessions as "fast, exciting and hot". After two days of hearing Levin play, Gabriel invited him to play on the tour. Other musicians involved were drummer Allan Schwartzberg, percussionist Jimmy Maelen, guitarist Steve Hunter, keyboardist Jozef Chirowski, and Larry Fast on synthesisers and programming.

Although mainly happy with the music, Gabriel felt that the album, particularly "Here Comes the Flood", was overproduced. Piano-only or piano with synth versions of that song appear on Fripp's album Exposure and his appearance on Kate Bush's television special in December 1979, in which Gabriel and Bush sang "Another Day" by Roy Harper. A third version appeared on the 1990 compilation album Shaking the Tree: Sixteen Golden Greats. Gabriel often performs the song live, accompanied by only himself on keyboard, either in German or English, depending on the audience. The song was debuted during an appearance on Thames Television's Good Afternoon in the summer of 1976.

Artwork
The front cover depicts Gabriel sitting in the front passenger seat of a 1974 Lancia 2000 owned by Storm Thorgerson, co-founder of Hipgnosis and the cover's designer. For the shoot, which took place in Wandsworth, London, the car was sprayed with water from a hose. The black-and-white image was then hand-coloured, and reflections modified using a scalpel by artist Richard Manning. Because Gabriel's first four albums were not titled or numbered, the album later became informally known as Car. An alternative proposal was to feature a photograph of Gabriel wearing contact lenses intended to give his eyes the appearance of metallic ball bearings; this was included on the inner sleeve.

Release
The album was released on 25 February 1977 on Charisma Records and in the US and Canada on Atco Records, and reached No. 7 in the UK and No. 38 in the US. The first single taken from it, "Solsbury Hill", became a Top 20 hit in the UK and reached No. 68 on the Billboard Hot 100. The second single, "Modern Love", did not chart.

After Peter Gabriels release, Gabriel assembled a touring band, consisting of Fripp (occasionally using the pseudonym "Dusty Rhodes", and sometimes performing from offstage) and Hunter on guitar, Levin on bass, Fast on synthesisers, Schwartzberg on drums, Phil Aaberg on keyboards and Jimmy Maelen on percussion. The first leg of his debut solo tour, entitled "Expect the Unexpected", started on 5 March 1977 in the United States and continued until April. The UK portion of the tour concluded on 30 April. A second leg assembled a different band, which included Sid McGinnis on guitar, Levin on bass, Jerry Marotta on drums and Bayette on keyboards. The "Sightings in the Test Area During Autumn" leg began on 30 August and saw the band play throughout England and Europe before concluding on 1 November 1977.

Reception 

Rolling Stone critic Stephen Demorest described Peter Gabriel as "a grab bag collection of songs that bear little resemblance to one another" and called it "an impressively rich debut album". Robert Christgau of The Village Voice found it "a lot smarter" than Gabriel's past work in Genesis, and despite noting that "every time I delve beneath its challenging textures to decipher a line or two I come up a little short", felt that the album was "worth considering". Nick Kent, writing in NME in 1978, said that Peter Gabriel was "a fine record with at least one 24-carat irresistible classic in 'Solsbury Hill' and a strong supporting cast of material that, all in all, in a year besmeared with great albums was, in retrospect, sorely underrated". The album received the prize of the French Académie Charles Cros.

Track listing 
All songs by Peter Gabriel, except where indicated.

Personnel 
Peter Gabriel – lead vocals, keyboard, flute, recorder
Robert Fripp – electric guitar, classical guitar, banjo
Tony Levin – bass guitar, tuba, leader of the Barbershop Quartet
Jozef Chirowski – keyboard
Larry Fast – synthesizer, programming
Allan Schwartzberg – drums
Steve Hunter – acoustic guitar on "Solsbury Hill", "Slowburn" and "Waiting for the Big One"; electric guitar, electric rhythm guitar, pedal steel
Dick Wagner – backing vocals, electric guitar on "Here Comes the Flood"
Jimmy Maelen – percussion, synthibam, bones
London Symphony Orchestra – strings on "Down the Dolce Vita" and "Here Comes the Flood"
Michael Gibbs – arrangement of orchestra

Charts 

Album

Weekly charts

Year-end charts

Singles

Certifications

Notes

References

External links 
 

Peter Gabriel albums
1977 debut albums
Albums with cover art by Hipgnosis
Albums produced by Bob Ezrin
Atco Records albums
Charisma Records albums
Albums recorded at Morgan Sound Studios
Albums recorded at Olympic Sound Studios